Ma Niu Village, sometimes spelled Ma Liu, is a village on Kau To Shan, near Fo Tan, Sha Tin District, Hong Kong.

Administration
Ma Niu is a recognized village under the New Territories Small House Policy.

History
The village historically shared a single higher earthgod shrine with Cheung Lek Mei, Kau To and Ma Liu Shui. All were part of the Fo Tan Yeuk.

In the early 20th century, the villagers of Ma Niu generated a large part of their income from selling fuel cut from the extensive woods which were to be found near the village.

See also
 Kau To Hang
 Kau To Village
 Kau Yeuk (Sha Tin)

References

External links

 Delineation of area of existing village Ma Liu (Sha Tin) for election of resident representative (2019 to 2022)

Villages in Sha Tin District, Hong Kong